Mirko Tepavac (13 August 1922 – 28 August 2014) was a Yugoslav  and Serbian politician and communist activist who was the Minister of Foreign Affairs of the SFR Yugoslavia.

References

1922 births
2014 deaths
People from Zemun
Yugoslav Partisans members
Foreign ministers of Yugoslavia
League of Communists of Yugoslavia politicians
Serbian politicians
Burials at Belgrade New Cemetery